Northwest Big River is a neighborhood in Wichita, Kansas, United States.  A mixed commercial and residential area, it lies on the south bank of the Arkansas River in the northwestern part of the city.

Geography
It consists of the area between 21st Street to the north, the Arkansas River to the northeast, Sheridan Street to the east, 13th Street to the south, West Street to the west, and Interstate 235 to the northwest. The Benjamin Hills neighborhood lies across the river to the north, Indian Hills Riverbend lies to the east, Indian Hills lies to the southeast, La Placita Park lies to the south, and Orchard Park lies to the southwest.

Government
For the purposes of representation on the Wichita City Council, Northwest Big River is in Council District 6.

For the purposes of representation in the Kansas Legislature, the neighborhood is in the 25th district of the Kansas Senate and the 92nd and 105th districts of the Kansas House of Representatives.

Education
Wichita Public Schools operates one school immediately west of the neighborhood:  O. K. Elementary School.

Media
KAKE, the ABC television affiliate in Wichita, broadcasts from studios on North West Street in Northwest Big River.

Parks and recreation
Big Arkansas River Park is a  space on the south bank of the Arkansas River immediately north of 21st Street. The  Arkansas River Bicycle Path ends in the park.  Sycamore Park spans  on West 15th Street and includes a basketball court, children’s playground, softball diamond, and tennis courts.  Both parks are maintained by the city’s Department of Park and Recreation.

Transportation
13th Street and West Street are the arterial roads in the neighborhood.  13th Street runs east-west along its south side; West Street runs north-south along its west side.  In addition, 21st Street runs east-west along the neighborhood’s north side.

Wichita Transit offers bus service to Northwest Big River on its 15 route.

References

Geography of Wichita, Kansas
Neighborhoods in Kansas